Yan Shunkai (6 June 1937 – 16 October 2017) was a Chinese comedian, actor and film director.

Yan rose to fame after portraying Ah Q in The True Story of Ah Q,  which was based on an episodic novella by Lu Xun, one of the pioneers of modern Chinese literature. He was  awarded the Best Actor at the 6th Hundred Flowers Awards and earned "The Gold Stick Prize" at the Second International Comedy Film Festival of Vevey, Switzerland in 1982.

Biography

Early life and education
Born in Shanghai on June 6, 1937, Yan enrolled in the Central Academy of Drama in 1959, graduating in 1963. After graduation, he joined the Shanghai Farce Troupe.

Career
Yan first garnered recognition for his acting in 1980, when his performance in The True Story of Ah Q earned him a Best Actor award at the 6th Hundred Flowers Awards, the Chinese equivalent of the Golden Globes, and received "The Gold Stick Prize" at the Second International Comedy Film Festival of Vevey, Switzerland in 1982. The film is his film debut.

Yan co-starred with Liu Falu, Jin Kangmin, Niu Hong, Chen Qi and Fang Qingzhuo in the 1983 film Spring in the Hometown as a lame person.

In 1984, Yan starred as Du Xiaoxi in Wang Weiyi's drama film The New Stories Of Du Xiaoxi.

Yan appeared in the romance film The Female Director's Boyfriend (1986), in which he played Cui Hailong.

In 1988, Yan made his directorial debut The Story of Ah Tan, and he also starred as Ah Tan in the film.

In 1996, Yan starred with Lu Yanfang in the comedy film The Harmonious Gouple.

Yan appeared in Huang Jianzhong's Girls in the Red Chamber (2002), based on Cao Xueqin's classical novel Dream of the Red Chamber, as Jia She, one of the heads of the Jia family.

In 2003, he was cast in the romance television series Dear Angle with Chang Yue and Li Xiaolu.

Yan filmed in Legend of the Book's Tower, a wuxia television series starring Sharla Cheung, Nicky Wu, Allen Lin, and Tiffany Tang.

In 2006, Yan had a minor role in Pretty Girls in Jianghu. The drama stars Christy Chung, Du Chun, and Liang Guanhua.

In 2010, when he was 72, he starred as Wang Mugen, reuniting him with co-star Yvonne Yung, who played his daughter-in-law, in the television series My Ugly Dad.

Death
Yan died on 16 October 2017, aged 80, in Shanghai.

Filmography

Film

TV series

CCTV New Year's Gala

Film and TV Awards

References

External links

1937 births
2017 deaths
Central Academy of Drama alumni
Male actors from Shanghai
Chinese male film actors
Chinese film directors
Chinese male television actors
Chinese male stage actors